Angel's Revenge may refer to:

 Angels Revenge, a 1979 American film 
 Angel's Revenge (TV series), a 2014 South Korean TV series